In the Company of Heroes is a book by Michael Durant and Steven Hartov about Durant's experiences in the Battle of Mogadishu, Korea, the Persian Gulf, Thailand, Panama, and Iraq. In the Battle of Mogadishu, the MH-60 Black Hawk helicopter code-named Super Six-Four that Durant was piloting was shot down over Somalia by a rocket-propelled grenade on October 3, 1993, and he was attacked by a mob and had to fight for his life. MSG Gary Gordon and SFC Randy Shughart volunteered to try to protect the pilot from the mob; while Durant was severely injured, he survived, but Gordon and Shughart did not, and were posthumously awarded the Medal of Honor for their bravery.  Durant became a prisoner of Somali warlord Mohamed Farah Aidid for 11 days.

The introduction is written by Mark Bowden, author of the book Black Hawk Down: A Story of Modern War.  Durant was portrayed by Ron Eldard in the film Black Hawk Down, based on Bowden's book.

The book was a New York Times bestseller.

Publishers Weekly reviewed it as a good look into war, and engaging, though lacking in introspection and sometimes off-topic.

References 

 Durant, Michael with Hartov, Steven (2003). In The Company of Heroes. New American Liberty. New York, New York (USA).
 Bowden, Mark (March 1999). Black Hawk Down: A Story of Modern War. Atlantic Monthly Press. Berkeley, California (USA).

2003 non-fiction books
Battle of Mogadishu (1993)
Books about military history
American non-fiction books
Works about the Somali Civil War
New American Library books